The small box respirator was the initial compact version of the recent gas mask. In late 1916, the respirator was introduced by the British with the purpose to provide reliable protection against chlorine and phosgene gas. The respirator offered a first line of defense against the gas. A later and more toxic gas, Mustard Gas, was created by Germans and was a vesicant that burnt the skin of individuals that were exposed to it. Death rates were high with exposure to both the mixed phosgene chlorine and mustard gas, however with soldiers having readily available access to the small box respirator, death rates had lowered significantly. Light and reasonably fitting, the respirator was a key piece of equipment to readily protect the respiratory health of soldiers on the battlefield.

Materials and construction 
The small box respirator consists of a face mask made of rubberized fabric connected by a rubber fabric hose to a canister made of tinplate containing a chemical absorbent. The respirator mask is light in weight and is made from khaki cotton fabric that is plated with a thin layer of black rubber. Khaki cotton tape, located in the middle of forehead region of the mask, connects to black elastic strips from the cheeks to ascertain a suitable fit for the carrier. The circular eye pieces are set in metal rims that are consistent of celloid which is sealed on with rubber sealant. A circular wired nose clip with rubber covered jaws sits between the internal region of the eyes. The mask contains an internal mouthpiece  with an exhale valve made of black rubber consisting of a flange to fit both mouth and teeth. The mouthpiece is joined by a brass tube to the rubberized hose leading to the canister. The rubber hose is around 30 cm in length and is made of vulcanized stockinette fabric making the hose flexible and strong. The canister, which was oval shaped, contained cotton and wire gauze filters to retain any poisonous substances.

History of use

Chemical Gas Attacks 

The small box respirators were introduced into the British and Imperial forces on the Western Front (World War I) in 1916. The mask was created to provide reliable protection against chlorine and phosgene gas. The first use of phosgene and chlorine gas was on 19 December 1915 whereby it was used against French and Canadian units in the Second Battle of Ypres. German scientists at the Kaiser Wilhelm Institute developed the weaponized chlorine gas. It was placed into specialized cylinders that released into a dense cloud that settled in enemy trenches to draw soldiers out from protected areas. The gas was later used against British Troops on the Western Front in Flanders in December 1915. British anti gas helmets were appointed to repel the chlorine gas; issues later presented when the helmets could not withstands the effects of the phosgene gas. Chlorine was readily detected in battles as the gas tainted a yellowish green cloud and had a pungent odor. The situation became problematic on the introduction of the mixed phosgene and chlorine as phosgene is colorless and smells of freshly cut hay. Phosgene was up to six times as potent than chlorine and did not suggest any urgent symptoms that was associated with the coughing and discomfort that chlorine did. Psychological impacts of the gas had resulted in unexplained anxiety attacks which would cause men to tear off their gas masks to breathe correctly exposing them to the gas. Soldiers that were affected by the gas, did not recall feeling symptoms until hours later. 85% of the fatalities that occurred due to chemical weapons, was from the phosgene mixed chlorine gas. The use of the small box respirators had lowered mortality rates significantly; for this reason the creation and usage of the mustard gas, a vesicant that burned the skin, was introduced as the new weapon of chemical warfare in 1917.

Canadian Usage 
Canadian troops began to receive small box respirators in late November 1916. While the respirators acted as the first line of defense in some British troops, other Canadian and some British troops were still subjected to the earlier and less effective anti gas masks, the PH helmet. The PH helmet was used throughout early 1916 by the British troops in which was designed to be tucked under the shirt of the wearer. The masks became effective in being able to sustain phosgene gas, through its added hexamine to sodium phenate solution which acted as an absorbent to the phosgene gas. Both equipment were to be present on the troop members during battle. It became an increasing issue that PH helmets were being dropped and lost during battle; an estimated 9 million PH helmets were dropped while barely any respirators were lost. Canadian and British troops were not convinced that double the protection was needed. Both masks were liable to damage and therefore it became necessary to have both masks present to withstand the gas damage.

Third party effects 
Although British gas masks were fairly reliable in protection against gas attacks, there was no guarantee that it would fully work during battle. Soldiers who were injured and wounded provided strenuous difficulty to the soldiers that were treating them due to complications that were followed by the respirator. The respirator caused trauma to the victims that were injured. The gas used by the troops affected the civilians which lived and worked in environment around them. Not only affecting the military populations, gas clouds would spread through the winds spreading to civilian homes through villages and towns. This caused issues with health and lifestyle as civilians did not have access or education to training methods to protect against the gas. This resulted in deaths in the counts to about 5,200 civilians; the number is estimated to be much higher. Even when symptoms of the gas were not immediately present,  exposure to the gas was the cause of many illnesses and resulting fatalities of civilian lives. The gas remained such an issue that troops had to provide refined gas masks for animals such as horses, messenger pigeons, and dogs that were needed in military planning.

Complications with the Small Box Respirators 
The small box respirators had harsh criticism during its usage in the 1916 by both British and Canadian troops. The respirator restricted performance as it was found to affect physiological aspects of the soldiers' performances in the line of battle. The respirator gas mask presented a very unnatural way of breathing during heavy activity of troops on the battlefield. The respirator had six different sizes to which each man was fitted. The respirator would lose its air-tightness over time and required constant check under men of their commands. The eye pieces were very prone to fogging and misting causing obstructed vision to soldiers along with the extreme discomfort of the nose clip. The flexible hose was vulnerable to damage, which in cases resulted in failure to filter the gas. Adjusting the gas mask was problematic and could result to death if not worn correctly; It was compulsory that soldiers had previous practice with the mask before using in the line of battle. The respirator caused intensive wheezing and is said to even give extreme heat and exhaustion that may result in suffocation-like symptoms.

Evolution of the Small Box Respirator

Black Veil Respirator 
What was the first and proper respirator that was developed was the Black Veil Respirator by John Scott Haldane. The respirator was used on the evening of 22 April 1915 in Belgium, close to Ypres, by British troops. Home made respirators, known as the black veil, comprised cotton wool that was wrapped in either muslin or flannelette. The mask was ineffective and almost completely useless when dry. When the mask was either moist and wet from being soaked in the absorbent solution, it formed an airtight fit over the troops mouth and noise. The cotton, which was loosely woven material, provided better absorption of the solution and allowed troop members to breathe effectively. A long piece of black veil cotton was folded to form a large sheath pocket to retain the chemical absorbents. The cotton veil was then wrapped around the users head and tied. The chemical absorbents consisting of anti gas chemicals such as sodium hyposulfite, washing soda, Glycerine acetate and water allowed for consistent and dense moisturizing in the respirator. The respirator could be worn above the eyes to protect against tear gas. The structure and material of the respirator made it effective for about five minutes against the regular dosage concentrations of chlorine attacks. The mask was issued at 20 May 1915. A more effective respirator that could last longer was needed; the development of Hypo Helmet was created in hopes of emergency to replace the inferior respirator.

British Hypo-Helmet 
Earlier versions of the gas mask prior to 1915s development of the small box respirator were crude and ineffective as no troops had yet experienced poison warfare; even the idea of it from troops, was far-fetched. One of the first gas masks seen on the battlefields of the early world war was the British Hypo helmet, after recent failure and ineffectiveness of the black veil respirator. The helmet was intended to replace the black veil in order to effectively protect against chlorine attacks. Yet, the mask provided unreliable protection as the eye pieces were extremely fragile. The protective valve of the Hypo Helmet was vulnerable and prone to breaking. The helmet, much like the black veil, was dipped in anti-gas chemicals such as sodium hyposulphite, washing soda, glycerine and water. The properties of gas chemicals was used later and refined to develop better and more effective masks. The helmet was made from woolen viyella and flannel fabric that was refined from material made from mica, which was brittle and damage prone. The helmet was hot and uncomfortable as the fitting required users to tuck inside uniforms. The helmet was a big improvement from the black veil but proved difficult for soldiers to aim and use weapons with the helmet acquired. The helmet accumulated carbon dioxide in the uniforms of the users as no expiration valve was present. It was issued to troops by 6 June 1915. The later and more refined gas mask, small box respirators was developed in 1916 to be used to protect against the more toxic mixture of gas, phosgene and chlorine gas.

References 

Military personal equipment
Gas masks of the United Kingdom
British inventions
1916 introductions